Rabbi Yaakov Yehezkiya Grunwald (born April 17, 1948) is an American rebbe, the current leader of the Pupa Hasidic group in the United States.

Biography
He was born in Antwerp, the second son of Yosef Greenwald (the last rabbi of Papa, Hungary before the Holocaust) and his second wife, Miriam. When he was a child the family emigrated to the United States, where his father founded the Pupa hasidic dynasty.

He was married to Bracha Frieda.

He served as a dayan (rabbinic judge) and posek of the Pupa hasidim, and on his father's death 1984 succeeded him as the Pupa rebbe.

Most of his followers live in the United States (mainly the state of New York) and Canada, and a few in Israel and London.

Greenwald family
American Hasidic rabbis
Hasidic rebbes
Living people
People from Williamsburg, Brooklyn
1948 births
Mohels